Ron San Filipo is former American football and baseball coach.  He was the head football and baseball coach at Kean University in Union, New Jersey. In three seasons as head football coach (1972–1974), he compiled a record of 14–13. In three seasons as the baseball head coach (1973–1975) he compiled a 29–29 record.

Head coaching record

Football

References

Year of birth missing
Possibly living people
Kean Cougars baseball coaches
Kean Cougars football coaches